Agedrup is a village and northeastern suburb of Odense, Funen, Denmark. It contains a church, Agedrup Church (Agedrup Kirke).

References

Suburbs of Odense
Populated places in Funen